Laflin may refer to:

Laflin, Missouri
Laflin, Pennsylvania
Addison H. Laflin, a New York politician
Bonnie-Jill Laflin, an American model and television personality
Duane Laflin, a magician
Fordyce L. Laflin, a New York politician
Matthew Laflin, an American 19th-century businessman